Yvonne Borree is a former principal dancer at New York City Ballet. She was raised in Norfolk, Virginia, where she began her dance studies with the Tidewater Ballet Association at four years of age.

She attended the School of American Ballet for three summers and was invited to enter SAB full-time in 1985. Two years later Yvonne became an apprentice with SAB's parent company, New York City Ballet, and joined the corps de ballet in 1988. she danced with guest artist Mikhail Baryshnikov in George Balanchine's "Duo Concertant" in Spring, 1992.

Ms. Borree was promoted to the rank of soloist the next year and to principal in 1997. She is the daughter of Susan Borree, who danced with Jerome Robbins' Ballets: USA, with New York City Ballet and American Ballet Theatre. Yvonne Borree's farewell performance took place Sunday, June 6, 2010, and consisted of ballets by Christopher Wheeldon and George Balanchine:
 Estancia
 Duo Concertant 
 Brahms–Schoenberg Quartet

Originated rôles

Robert La Fosse 
 Danses De Cour

Miriam Mahdaviani 
 Correlazione

Peter Martins 

 Ash
 The Chairman Dances
 Delight of the Muses
 Fearful Symmetries
 Jazz, or Six Syncopated Movements
 Quartet for Strings
 Sinfonia
 The Sleeping Beauty The White Cat in Puss In Boots
 Slonimsky's Earbox
 Stabat Mater
 Thou Swell

Christopher Wheeldon 
 Carnival of the Animals

Featured rôles

George Balanchine 
 Apollo
 Coppélia (Swanilda)
 Divertimento No. 15
 Donizetti Variations
 Duo Concertant
 The Four Temperaments
 The Nutcracker Sugarplum Fairy and Dewdrop
 Harlequinade Colombine
 Raymonda Variations
 Scotch Symphony
 La Sonnambula
 Square Dance
 The Steadfast Tin Soldier
 Stravinsky Violin Concerto
 Symphony in C
 Symphony in Three Movements
 Tschaikovsky Pas de Deux
 Union Jack
 Western Symphony

Sean Lavery 
 Romeo and Juliet

Peter Martins 
 A Fool for You
 The Sleeping Beauty Princess Aurora
 Swan Lake

Kevin O'Day 
 Dvorak Bagatelles
 Badchonim, or Merry-Makers

Jerome Robbins 
 The Concert
 Dances at a Gathering
 The Four Seasons
 The Goldberg Variations
 In the Night
 Mother Goose

Christopher Wheeldon 
 Mercurial Manoeuvres

Television 

 Dance in America, George Balanchine's Western Symphony 
 PBS Live from Lincoln Center, New York City Ballet's Diamond Project: Ten Years of New Choreography, 2002, Peter Martins' Them Twos

Footnotes 

New York City Ballet principal dancers
American ballerinas
Living people
Year of birth missing (living people)
School of American Ballet alumni